Beenleigh State High School (BSHS) is a public, co-educational high school located in Beenleigh, Queensland, Australia.

Extracurricular activities 
BSHS offers a number of extracurricular activities, including debating, Air Force cadets, sports, and an agricultural show team and dance troupe.

Academic achievement 
In 2021, 355 students received a Senior Statement.

Notable alumni 
 Tonie Carroll, professional rugby league player with the Brisbane Broncos.
 Tori Groves-Little, professional Australian rules footballer with the Gold Coast Suns.
Nicholle Becker, radio presenter with 96five Family Radio
Rahmat Akbari, professional Football player for Brisbane Roar and represents Afghanistan at an international level.

See also

List of schools in Greater Brisbane

References 

Public high schools in Queensland
Schools in Logan City
Beenleigh, Queensland
1963 establishments in Australia
Educational institutions established in 1963